The Portuguese ambassador in Washington, D.C. is the official representative of the Government in Lisbon to the Government of the United States.

List of representatives 
The representatives have been:

References 

 
United States
Portugal